German submarine U-35 was a Type VIIA U-boat of Nazi Germany's Kriegsmarine. She was built three years before the start of World War II. The submarine was laid down on 2 March 1936 by Friedrich Krupp Germaniawerft at Kiel, launched on 24 September 1936, and commissioned on 3 November that year under the command of Kapitänleutnant (Kptlt.) Klaus Ewerth. The U-boat was featured on the cover of Life magazine on 16 October 1939, as in the days preceding, it "courteously" rescued all the sailors of a Greek ship that it was about to sink.

U-35 was scuttled just three months into World War II in November 1939. During her service, she conducted three patrols (last pre-war and two war) and sank four vessels for a total loss of 7,850 GRT while damaging one vessel of around 6,014 GRT.

Construction and design

Construction
U-35 was ordered by the Kriegsmarine on 25 March 1935 (technically in violation of the Treaty of Versailles, but consistent with the soon to be signed Anglo-German Naval Agreement). Her keel was laid down on 2 March 1936 by Friedrich Krupp Germaniawerft in Kiel as yard number 558. She was launched on 24 September 1936 and commissioned on 3 November of that year under the command of Kptlt. Klaus Ewerth.

Design

Like all Type VIIA submarines, U-35 displaced  while surfaced and  when submerged. U-35s propulsion consisted of two MAN 6-cylinder 4-stroke M6V 40/46 diesel engines that totaled . Her maximum rpm was between 470 and 485. The submarine was also equipped with two Brown, Boveri & Cie GG UB 720/8 electric motors that totaled . Their maximum rpm was 322. These power plants gave U-35 a total speed of  while surfaced and  when submerged. The U-boat's test depth was  but she could go as deep as  without having her hull crushed. U-35s armament consisted of five  torpedo tubes, (four located in the bow and one in the stern). She could carry up to 11 torpedoes or 22 TMA mines or 33 TMB mines. U-35 was also equipped with a 8.8 cm SK C/35 naval gun and had 220 rounds stowed on board. Her anti-aircraft defenses consisted of one  anti-aircraft gun.

Service history

Pre-war
U-35 was known as the "bad luck boat" of the 2nd U-Boat Flotilla ("Saltzwedel") due to several accidents. She was rammed by a freighter in 1937, overrun and badly damaged by the pocket battleship  in 1938, and was struck by an aircraft in 1939. She also had some success; U-35 (together with ), was the first U-boat to patrol the Atlantic, sailing under the command of Hans-Rudolf Rösing to Ponta Delgada in the Azores. She then undertook several patrols to Spain, Ceuta, Gibraltar and Morocco under the command of Hermann Michahelles and Werner Lott. After the death of Michahelles in a car accident, Otto Kretschmer was briefly given U-35 as his first U-boat command. Before taking over as the temporary skipper, Kretschmer, while serving as the watch officer, was accidentally left on the deck while U-35 dived during maneuvers and nearly drowned. During another peacetime drill in 1938, her sister boat, U-30, was involved in a near-fatal collision with U-35.

Last pre-war patrol
U-35s last pre-war patrol began on 27 August 1939, and took her from Memel (in the Baltic) to Kiel, where she arrived on 1 September, the first day of the invasion of Poland.

First war patrol
The U-boat departed Wilhelmshaven on 9 September 1939. The U-boat escaped without damage and sailed northabout the British Isles to attack shipping.

On 18 September she stopped a group of three fishing trawlers west-north-west of St.Kilda. She sank two with gunfire, the 326 GRT Arlita and the 295 GRT Lord Minto after confiscating their radios and fishing gear but allowing their crews to evacuate. A third trawler, Nancy Hague, was allowed to proceed after taking on the crews of the other vessels.

After 14:10 on 21 September, U-35 fired three torpedoes at Convoy OA-7 south-west of the Isles of Scilly. She missed a destroyer and a tanker, but damaged the 6,014 GRT British tanker Teakwood. The one sailor killed onboard Teakwood during this attack was the only person to have been killed during World War II in association with U-35.

At 18:45 on 1 October 1939, 42 miles off Ushant, U-35 stopped the unarmed neutral 2,239 GRT Belgian merchant ship Suzon, which was carrying 2,400 tons of pit props from Bordeaux to Cardiff. After the crew abandoned ship after an inspection, she was torpedoed and sunk.

Diamantis
About 13:15 on 3 October 40 miles west of the Scilly Islands, U-35 stopped the 4,990 GRT Greek freighter Diamantis, which was taking 7,700 tons of manganese ore from Pepel, Sierra Leone, to Barrow-in-Furness. Like Suzon, she was a neutral, but carrying a strategic cargo to Britain and therefore a "legitimate target". The crew, misunderstanding the U-boat's instructions, abandoned ship prematurely. After two G7a torpedoes exploded prematurely, the ship was sunk by a G7e torpedo. Because the ship's lifeboats were not suited for use in bad weather, Lott decided to take all crew members aboard.

U-35s commander Werner Lott later commented:

The next day, 4 October, U-35 was seen by people in Ventry and Ballymore, Co. Kerry easing into the bay. The U-boat launched a dinghy and brought ashore the 28 Greek sailors from Diamantis.

The U-boat returned to Wilhelmshaven on 12 October after 34 days at sea where Lott was reprimanded for his actions, which were regarded as having endangered his crew.

Commemoration
On Saturday, 17 October 2009, more than 200 people attended various celebratory events in Ventry to mark the rescue and landing of the Greek seamen. The occasion was organised by the newly formed Ventry Historical Society.

The main ceremony was held on the green in front of Quinn's Pub, where an inscribed commemorative stone was erected. Guests included the German Ambassador Dr. Busso von Alvensleben and the Mayor of the Oinousses Islands in the Aegean, Evangelos Elias Angelakos, who unveiled the memorial stone. Other guests included descendants of Panagos Pateras, the captain and owner of the ill-fated Diamantis, officers of Southern Command, members of the Irish Coast Guard, the crew of the Valentia lifeboat, and a troop of Sea Scouts from Tralee.

The secretary of the historical society, Dr. Breandán Ó Ciobháin, delivered a welcoming address in Irish, English, Greek, and German, and invited the German ambassador to address the gathering:

Mayor Angelakos said it was a great honor to attend the Ventry ceremony 70 years after the incident: "I would like to remind you of the magnanimous stance of Werner Lott, the commander of the U-35." The occurrence is one of only two such instances in World War II, where a German submarine crew risked its own safety to protect the crew of a vessel they torpedoed and sank.

Second war patrol
U-35 sailed from Wilhelmshaven on her second and final war patrol on 18 November 1939. Lord Louis Mountbatten, commanding the British squadron, took the extraordinary step of stopping his ships for an extended period of time and sending out boats to rescue the crew of the German submarine adrift in water. Consequently, unusual among U-boats lost during the war, all 43 hands on board survived and were taken prisoner. Indeed, every member of the U-35 crew during its short World War 2 service survived the war.

Summary of raiding history

References

Bibliography

External links

 

 Maritime Institute of Ireland

1936 ships
German Type VIIA submarines
Military units and formations of Nazi Germany in the Spanish Civil War
Ships built in Kiel
U-boats commissioned in 1936
U-boats sunk by depth charges
U-boats sunk by British warships
U-boats sunk in 1939
World War II shipwrecks in the North Sea
World War II submarines of Germany
Maritime incidents in November 1939